The  is a family residence in Chizu, Tottori Prefecture, Japan. The Ishitani family, an upper-class family, built a residence in the area. In the early 20th century the residence was greatly expanded by incorporating Western-style elements into the Japanese-style structure. The residence is spread across two floors and forty rooms. The Ishitani Residence is an important part of the Itaibara settlement. A number of its buildings have been designated Important Cultural Properties and its gardens are a registered Place of Scenic Beauty.

See also
 List of Important Cultural Properties of Japan (Shōwa period: structures)
 List of Places of Scenic Beauty of Japan (Tottori)

References

External links

Sightseeing Spots in and around Tottori City
Chizushuku and Itabara Settlement
Tottori Sightseeing Information

Geography of Tottori Prefecture
Tourist attractions in Tottori Prefecture
Buildings and structures in Tottori Prefecture
Houses completed in 1929
Important Cultural Properties of Japan
Registered Monuments of Japan